The Salem County Special Services School District is a school district in Salem County, New Jersey, United States, serving students with disabilities from Salem and Cumberland Counties. The district operates Cumberland Campus, located in Bridgeton, Salem Campus in Woodstown and Daretown School in Elmer. The District also operates programs in Upper Pittsgrove School in conjunction with the Upper Pittsgrove School District and Alternative High/Middle School programs.

As of the 2011–12 school year, the district's three schools had an enrollment of 99 students and 33.0 classroom teachers (on an FTE basis), for a student–teacher ratio of 3.00:1.

Administration
Core members of the district's administration are:
John R. Swain, Superintendent of Schools
John Bolil, Business Administrator / Board Secretary

References

External links
Official website

Woodstown, New Jersey
School districts in Cumberland County, New Jersey
School districts in Salem County, New Jersey